Ahamansu Islamic Senior High School is a public co-educational high school located in Ahamansu, Ghana.  It was the first Islamic senior high school in the Volta Region and one of three second cycle institutions in the Kadjebi District which became part of the Oti Region in 2019.

History 
Ahamansu Islamic Senior High School started as private high school in 2006 by the Zongo community with funds from donor organisations. The Ahamansu Traditional Council offered large parcels of land to be used as campus for its establishment.

Eric Osei was the first headmaster of the school from 2006 to 2010. In 2010 Godfried Nyarko replaced Osei as headmaster. Nyarko advised for the necessary measures to be taken to ease the financial burdens of the school and to curtail the school's over-reliance on the National Service Scheme for teachers.

Nyarko initiated the requisite processes with the help of staff and National Service Personnel, which eventually culminated in the absorption of the school into the public system. In 2011, officers from the Ghana Education Service Headquarters inspected the schools facilities and recommended its absorption. The school became public in the year 2012. Charlotte Agboga took over from Nyarko and became the headmistress of the school.

Academics 
Ahamansu Islamic Senior High School follows the West African Examinations Council and the secondary cycle of the Ghana Education Service curriculum. Students are required to take four core subjects and three or four specialised elective subjects under the various programmes throughout the duration of study.

Core subjects 
 English
 Core mathematics
 Integrated science
 Social studies

Electives
Students choose three or four electives from the following:
 Business studies
 General arts
 Agricultural science
 Home economics
 Visual arts

At the end of their studies, students sit the West African Senior School Certificate Examination, which qualifies them for further studies in tertiary institutions.

Extracurricular and co-curricular activities 
 Physical education
 Sports
 Basic Arabic education

Head of school

See also

 List of Senior High Schools in Ghana
 Education in Ghana
 Islamic Studies
 Islam in Ghana

References

Boarding schools in Ghana
Co-educational boarding schools
High schools in Ghana
Oti Region
Educational institutions established in 2006
2006 establishments in Ghana